Gopinatham is a rural village located in Chamarajanagar district, Karnataka, India, in the border area of Tamil Nadu. It is the birthplace of Veerappan.

Eco-tourism
The village is now a small-time tourist attraction and trekking is encouraged on a  trail. A trekking camp, managed by Government agencies, is located in the forests of Cauvery Wildlife Sanctuary, near the village. Trekking is also arranged to Yekehalla, where a small memorial is built by Forest Department of Karnataka State, to remember DCF P. Srinivas, who was beheaded by Veerappan, when the officer was lured to the spot on the pretext of surrender proposed by the brigand through his brother Arjun. Srinivas was attacked from behind when he was crossing a stream.

References

Villages in Chamarajanagar district
Tourism in Karnataka